The Kauai island-aster or Kauai hesperomannia (Hesperomannia lydgatei) is a rare species of flowering plant in the family Asteraceae.

It is found only in Hawaii, where it is endemic to Kauai.

It is threatened by habitat loss. There are fewer than 300 individuals remaining.

References

Sources

Hesperomannia
Endemic flora of Hawaii
Critically endangered plants
Taxonomy articles created by Polbot